Sheldon Sullivan (born February 3, 1995) is an American soccer player.

Career

Youth and College
Sullivan played four years of college soccer at the University of Virginia between 2014 and 2017.

Sullivan also played for Premier Development League side Reading United AC in 2015 and 2016.

Professional
On January 21, 2018, Sullivan was selected 66th overall in the 2018 MLS SuperDraft by Houston Dynamo.  On March 16, 2018, Sullivan signed with Houston's United Soccer League affiliate side Rio Grande Valley FC.

References

External links
 
 
 Sheldon Sullivan at Virginia Cavaliers

1995 births
Living people
American soccer players
Association football defenders
People from Stafford, Virginia
Reading United A.C. players
Rio Grande Valley FC Toros players
Soccer players from Virginia
USL Championship players
USL League Two players
Virginia Cavaliers men's soccer players
Houston Dynamo FC draft picks